Anthony J. (Bud) Pardini (January 10, 1932 – December 22, 2011) was an American politician in the state of Washington. He served in the Washington House of Representatives from 1953 to 1967 for district 35.

References

2011 deaths
1932 births
Republican Party members of the Washington House of Representatives